Locura "madness" in Spanish, is a mental disorder characterized as severe chronic psychosis 

Locura, album by Virus (Argentine band)
"Locura", track by John Zorn from Filmworks VIII: 1997
"Locura", song by Inna from Yo (album)

See also
¡Qué Locura! hidden camera-comedy television show from Venezuela